{{Album ratings
| rev1 = AbsolutePunk.net
| rev1Score = (83%) 
| rev2 = The Album Project
| rev2Score =  
| rev3 = Allmusic
| rev3Score = 
| rev4 = Entertainment Weekly
| rev4Score = (B+) 
| rev5 = Blender 
| rev5Score =  
| rev6 = Rolling Stone| rev6Score =  
}}Raise the Dead is the fourth studio album by rock band Phantom Planet. It was released on April 15, 2008. The CD includes reworked versions of "Leader" and "Geronimo", both of which appeared on the Limited Edition Tour EP, as well as a reworked version of "Do the Panic", which originally appeared on the band's 'bootleg' fanclub CD Phantom Planet: Negatives.

Early on in the recording process Phantom Planet's contract with Epic Records expired, which left them searching for a new record label. Soon after this, they signed to Fueled by Ramen, which produces bands such as Fall Out Boy, Paramore, Panic at the Disco, The Hush Sound and The Academy Is....

On January 20, 2008, Phantom Planet posted a bulletin on their Myspace page to announce that the official release date would be April 15, 2008. Fueled By Ramen re-released a teaser trailer and stated that the first single from the album will be a reworking of "Do the Panic".

In an interview with RaggedMag, vocalist Alex Greenwald explained that "all bands are kind of their own cult, you know, but we want to take it to a new level. We really like the show Lost, and even though it's totally fiction, there's this air of mystery that's lacking in a lot entertainment these days. I really like mystery in things, and what a little bit of enigma brings out of people and their imaginations...a band is about community, and within itself it is a brotherhood; it's companionship. But a band can't be anything without the people to love it. Our goal will be to recruit and befriend as many people as possible with our message."

Track listing

Singles
The second single is "Dropped". The video, directed by Eric Wareheim, was released in December 2008. The song was featured in the season opener of season two of Chuck.

Trivia
The song "Geronimo" was recorded by Phantom Planet with Dust Bros in 2005.

Personnel
Credits for Phantom Planet'' adapted from Discogs.

Musicians

Phantom Planet
Alex Greenwald – lead vocals, rhythm guitar
Sam Farrar  – bass guitar, backing vocals
Darren Robinson – lead guitar, backing vocals
Jeff Conrad – drums

Additional musicians
Children's Choir – vocals on "Leader"

Production

Tony Berg – producer
Stephen Marcussen – mastering
Awesome "Shawn" Everett - mixing

Charts

References

Phantom Planet albums
2008 albums
Albums produced by Tony Berg
Fueled by Ramen albums